Josephine Cook née Page, second marriage Josephine Honnor, (born 1931), is a female former athlete who competed for England.

Athletics career
She represented England in the shot put at the 1958 British Empire and Commonwealth Games in Cardiff, Wales.

References

1931 births
English female shot putters
Athletes (track and field) at the 1958 British Empire and Commonwealth Games
Living people
Commonwealth Games competitors for England